Jeon Woo-young (born 27 December 1987) is a South Korean footballer who plays as a central midfielder. His name Jeon Sung-chan is renamed Jeon Woo-young in January 2016.

Club career 
Jeon transferred from Seongnam in the summer of 2013. He made his debut for IPark on 31 July in a game against Suwon after recovering from an injury which kept him out for over a year. In the second half of the 2014 K League Classic season, Jeon became a regular starter in the heart of IPark's midfield as they went ten games unbeaten to avoid relegation. He transferred to Jeonnam Dragons following IPark's relegation at the end of the 2015 season.

In 2017, he moved to Malaysian's club Melaka United following the departure of Omid Nazari .

Club career statistics
As of 6 December 2015

References

External links 
 
 Jeon Woo-young at Jeonnam Dragons 

1987 births
Living people
Association football midfielders
South Korean footballers
Changwon City FC players
Seongnam FC players
Busan IPark players
Jeonnam Dragons players
Korea National League players
K League 1 players
Melaka United F.C. players